The 1985 Tour de France was the 72nd edition of Tour de France, one of cycling's Grand Tours. The Tour began in Plumelec with a prologue individual time trial on 28 June and Stage 11 occurred on 9 July with a mountainous stage to Morzine Avoriaz. The race finished on the Champs-Élysées in Paris on 21 July.

Prologue
28 June 1985 — Plumelec,  (individual time trial)

Stage 1
29 June 1985 — Vannes to Lanester,

Stage 2
30 June 1985 — Lorient to Vitre,

Stage 3
1 July 1985 — Vitre to Fougères,  (team time trial)

Stage 4
2 July 1985 — Fougères to Pont-Audemer,

Stage 5
3 July 1985 — Neufchâtel-en-Bray to Roubaix,

Stage 6
4 July 1985 — Roubaix to Reims,

Stage 7
5 July 1985 — Reims to Nancy,

Stage 8
6 July 1985 — Sarrebourg to Strasbourg,  (individual time trial)

Stage 9
7 July 1985 — Strasbourg to Épinal,

Stage 10
8 July 1985 — Épinal to Pontarlier,

Stage 11
9 July 1985 — Pontarlier to Morzine Avoriaz,

References

1985 Tour de France
Tour de France stages